The Massachusetts Department of Public Health is a governmental agency of the Commonwealth of Massachusetts with various responsibilities related to public health within that state.  It is headquartered in Boston and headed by Commissioner Monica Bharel.

Goal

Broadly stated, the goal of the Massachusetts Department of Public Health is to:
serve all the people in the Commonwealth, particularly the under served, and to promote healthy people, healthy families, healthy communities and healthy environments through compassionate care, education and prevention.

Bureaus and programs
Among the bureaus and programs of the Massachusetts Department of Public Health are the following:

Bureau of Communicable Disease Control is concerned with areas including tuberculosis prevention and control, sexually transmitted disease prevention, epidemiology, immunization, influenza and West Nile virus monitoring and control, disease quarantine requirements, HIV/AIDS surveillance and health programs for refugees and immigrants.
Bureau of Environmental Health has a broad mission of protecting against a variety of environmental exposures and environmental health concerns including epidemiologic and toxicological health assessments.  BEH monitors beaches, water, fish, wildlife, air quality, soil and other areas for lead, mercury, radiation and other contaminants.  The bureau also investigates likes between environmental factors and ailments such as asthma and lupus.
Bureau of Family and Community Health seeks to promote high quality, comprehensive, community-based, family-centered systems of care through divisions focused on areas such as perinatal and early childhood health, child and adolescent health, primary care and health access, special health needs, community health promotion, violence and injury prevention, nutrition, sexual assault and domestic violence prevention, statistics and evaluation.
Quality Assurance and Control is a bureau involved with areas such as determination of need, emergency medicine, various areas of licensure and certification  for health care professionals, organ transplant programs, drug control programs and clinical laboratory programs.
Center for Health Information, Statistics, Research and Evaluation monitors the health status of state residents through collecting information on births, deaths, marriage records, newly diagnosed cases of cancer, injuries, occupational conditions and illnesses, and health behaviors.
Bureau of Hospitals is organized as a system of four multi-specialty hospitals that provide acute and chronic care to those for whom community facilities are not available or access to health care is restricted.  The bureau operates Lemuel Shattuck Hospital, Tewksbury Hospital, Pappas Rehabilitation Hospital for Children and Western Mass Hospital.
Bureau of Laboratory Sciences provides public health testing services, and supports training and quality of in-state laboratories (hospital and private).  This bureau is poised for emergency response to biologic and chemical terrorism.
State Laboratory Institute houses two bureaus which provide diagnostic testing and vaccine production.
Public Health Library system consists of five individual libraries whose purpose is to serve the educational and research needs of public health professionals, health care providers and citizens.  This department also maintains the archives of the Massachusetts Department of Public Health.
Tobacco Control Program works to improve public health by reducing death and disability from tobacco use and addresses areas such as tobacco use among young people, exposure to second-hand smoke and tobacco-related disparities in specific population groups.
Office of Emergency Medical Services promotes statewide emergency medical services through the coordination of local EMS and first responders.
Office of Healthy Communities works to coordinate existing interdepartmental community health efforts, eliminate health disparities among population groups, and expand the reach of public health programs.
Office of Multicultural Health promotes the health and well being of racial and ethnic minority communities throughout the Commonwealth coordinates the translation of written materials throughout the department.
Office for Pharmacy Services establishes up to date clinical pharmacy practices, assures full regulatory compliance, implements and maintains pharmacy software and provides for all aspects of pharmacy services to public sector in a cost-effective and clinically responsible manner.

See also
Stroke Heroes Act FAST

References

Massachusetts Department of Public Health
Department of Public Health
State departments of health of the United States
1869 establishments in Massachusetts